Tomasz Sobecki (born 1952), is a Polish photographer. A native of Toruń, he has been an active fine art photographer since 1981.

Sobecki has had numerous individual exhibitions in Poland, as well as in European countries (England, Switzerland, Finland) and the United States, and participation in international collective exhibitions in Belgium, Germany and Japan. Some of his best-known photo series include Gothic – Shape and Light (1980–1985), Gothic Stained Glass (1985–1986), Shape of Light (1986–1990), and The City of Yesterday (2002). His work is displayed in the collections of the Art Museum of Łódź, District Museum of Toruń, and private and public collections in Poland and abroad.

In 1990 he won a grant from the Spanish Ministry of Foreign Affairs, and for the period 1991-1993 from the Polish Ministry of Culture and Art. He is the Polish art representative in Caracas, Venezuela. He was the organizer and curator of the 1999 European Design Annual exhibition, and in 2002, he participated in an "art dialogue" at the Arsenal Gallery in Toruń as a part of Franciszek Starowieyski's Face series.

References

External links
Website of Tomasz Sobecki
Interview for "Gazeta Wyborcza": "Nie bądźmy Toruniewem"
Exhibition: Tomasz Sobecki "Crucifix"
Tomasz Sobecki "Crucifix"
"Crazy Lokomotives" in Aleksandrów Kujawski
Gallery FF: List of exhibitions

1952 births
Date of birth missing (living people)
Living people
Polish photographers
People from Toruń
Fine art photographers